Anda Muizhniece (born 20 November 1991) is a Latvian cross-country skier who competes internationally.

She competed for Latvia at the FIS Nordic World Ski Championships 2017 in Lahti, Finland.

References

External links 
 

1991 births
Living people
Latvian female cross-country skiers
21st-century Latvian women